This list tabulates all of the 82 official mountain summits of  or more in height in the Alps, as defined by the International Climbing and Mountaineering Federation (UIAA). All are located within France, Italy or Switzerland, and are often referred to by mountaineers as the Alpine four-thousanders. A further table of 46 subsidiary mountain points which did not meet the UIAA's selection criteria is also included. 

The official UIAA list of 82 mountain summits, titled in English as 'The 4000ers of the Alps' was first published in 1994. They were selected primarily on a prominence of at least ) above the highest adjacent col or pass. Additional criteria were used to deselect or include some points, based on the mountain's overall morphology and mountaineering significance. (For example, the Grand Gendarme on the Weisshorn was excluded, despite meeting the prominence criterion as it was simply deemed part of that mountain's ridge.) A further 46 additional points of mountaineering significance, such as Pic Eccles, which did not meet the UIAA's primary selection criteria, were then included within an 'enlarged list'.         

Another, less formal, list of 4000 metre alpine mountains, containing only independent peaks with a prominence of over 100m, and based on an earlier 1990s publications by Richard Goedeke, contains just 51 mountains.

Official list
The table shows the 82 four-thousanders in the Alps that are recognised by the UIAA. They are located in Switzerland (48), Italy (38) and France (25).

Clicking the symbol at the head of the column sorts the table by that column’s data.

Enlarged list

The following expandable table forms an extended list of 46 ‘lesser summits’ identified by the UIAA. These are either: 
secondary summits or gendarmes which satisfy the topographic criteria, but are part of other well-defined mountain summits already listed above, 
or have failed to meet the topographic criteria, but have been included through more subjective criteria (i.e. morphological or mountaineering significance).

Number of Alpine four-thousanders and distribution
Since no exact and formal definition of a 'mountain' exists, the number of 4000-metre summits is arbitrary. The topographic prominence is an important factor to decide the official nomination of a summit. The 'Official list' proposed by the UIAA is based not only on prominence but also on other criteria such as the morphology (general appearance) and mountaineering interest. Summits such as Punta Giordani or Mont Blanc de Courmayeur have much less than the 30 metres minimum prominence criterion but are included in the list because of the other criteria. In comparison, the official 14 eight-thousanders recognised by the UIAA have all a prominence of over 600 metres (despite a proposed expansion). A minimum prominence criterion of 300 metres would reduce the number of Alpine four-thousanders to only 29, whilst a prominence criterion of 100 metres would raise it to 49.

The table below gives the number of four-thousanders as a function of their minimum prominence.

See also

 :Category:Alpine three-thousanders
 List of mountain lists – list of peak-bagging lists

Notes

References

Bibliography
 Dumler, Helmut and Willi P. Burkhardt, The High Mountains of the Alps, Diadem, 1994
 Goedeke, Richard, Alpine 4000m Peaks by the Classic Routes, (2nd ed.) Menasha Ridge Press, 1997
 Goedeke, Richard, 4000er Tourenführer, Die Normalrouten auf alle Viertausender der Alpen, Bruckmann 01.04.2022 (ISBN 978-3-7343-2419-2)
 McLewin, Will, In Monte Viso’s Horizon: Climbing All the Alpine 4000m Peaks, Ernest Press, 1991
 Moran, Martin, The 4000m Peaks of the Alps: Selected Climbs, Alpine Club, 2007
 Club 4000, Tutti i 4000 - L'aria sottile dell'alta quota, Vivalda Editori - CAI Torino, 2010

External links
UIAA: Mountain Classification (International Climbing and Mountaineering Federation)
Die Viertausender der Alpen (Germany, Thomas Schabarer & Daniel Roth)
Club 4000 (Italy, Torino, Alpine Club)
The 4000m Project (Switzerland, Zermatt, Herve Liboureau)

Four-thousanders
Mountaineering in the Alps